Long Hải may refer to several places in Vietnam, including:

Long Hải (township), a township of Long Điền District
Long Hải, Bình Thuận, a commune of Phú Quý District